"The Monkey" is a short story by Stephen King, first published as a booklet included in Gallery magazine in 1980. It was significantly revised and published in King's collection Skeleton Crew in 1985.

"The Monkey" was nominated for a British Fantasy Award for best short story in 1982.

Plot summary

The story begins with two young brothers, Peter and Dennis, finding a cymbal-banging monkey toy in the attic of their great uncle's house. Soon, it's revealed how their father, Hal, discovered the toy monkey inside an antique chest owned by his father (Hal's father was a merchant mariner who disappeared under mysterious circumstances; Hal suspects that the monkey led to his father's disappearance). The monkey is actually cursed, and every time it claps the mechanical cymbals together, someone close to Hal dies. Hal was tormented by the monkey as a child. He helplessly watched as the toy worked its lethal enchantment onto his family and killed them off, until Hal chucked it down an old well at the home of his uncle. In the present, Hal takes the monkey and throws it into Crystal Lake, hoping that it will be finished for good and never kill anyone again. The story ends with an excerpt from a newspaper article, which reports the mysterious death of many fish in the lake.

Similar stories
The X-Files episode "Chinga", scripted by Stephen King, deals with a cursed doll and bears similarities to "The Monkey".  This doll, which deals out suffering in much the same way as the monkey, similarly finds itself sinking to the bottom of the ocean at the end of the episode.
 
The film The Devil's Gift is very similar to "The Monkey," leading some to believe that the filmmakers plagiarized the story. The Devil's Gift was later re-edited as the second story in the film Merlin's Shop of Mystical Wonders, which was featured on the television series Mystery Science Theater 3000.

In the Supernatural episode "Home", the evil entity of the episode possesses a toy monkey with cymbals, which turned on the garbage disposal while a plumber was working with the sink.

See also
 Stephen King short fiction bibliography

References

External links
King's official website

1980 short stories
Horror short stories
Short stories by Stephen King
Works originally published in Gallery (magazine)
Thriller short stories